The Rodgers Baronetcy, of Groombridge in the County of Kent, is a title in the Baronetage of the United Kingdom. It was created on 29 June 1964 for the Conservative politician John Rodgers. As of 2010 the title is held by his second son, the third Baronet, who succeeded his elder brother in 1997.

Rodgers baronets, of Groombridge (1964)
Sir John Charles Rodgers, 1st Baronet (1906–1993)
Sir (John Fairlie) Tobias Rodgers, 2nd Baronet (1940–1997)
Sir (Andrew) Piers Wingate Akin-Sneath Rodgers, 3rd Baronet (born 1944).

The heir apparent is the present holder's eldest son Thomas Rodgers (born 1979).

Arms

Notes

References
Kidd, Charles, Williamson, David (editors). Debrett's Peerage and Baronetage (1990 edition). New York: St Martin's Press, 1990, 

Baronetcies in the Baronetage of the United Kingdom